Galleria Corporate Center is a 29-storey office building in Ortigas Center, in Quezon City. It is located beside Robinsons Galleria.

Tenants
Building occupants are Digitel, Robinsons Bank, and Robinsons Land.

References

Skyscrapers in Ortigas Center
Skyscraper office buildings in Metro Manila